Mino is a masculine given name and nickname which may refer to:

Given name
 Mino da Fiesole (c. 1429–1484), also known as Mino di Giovanni, Italian sculptor
 Mino di Graziano (1289–1323), Italian painter
 Mino Argento (born 1927), Italian painter
 Mino Celsi (1514–c. 1576), Italian ambassador and scholar
 Mino Denti (born 1945), Italian retired road cyclist
 Mino De Rossi (1931–2022), Italian road bicycle and track cyclist
 Mino Doro (1903–1992), Italian film actor
 Mino Milani (1928–2022), Italian writer, cartoonist, journalist and historian

Nickname
 Fermo Favini (1936–2019), Italian footballer
 Fermo Mino Martinazzoli (1931–2011), Italian lawyer and politician, Minister of Defence and Minister of Justice
 Carmine Mino Raiola (1967–2022), Italian football agent

Italian masculine given names
Lists of people by nickname